Ludlum Measurements is an American manufacturer of radiation detection and monitoring equipment such as geiger counters, scintillation counters, scalers, and other radiation detection equipment.

Overview
The company is based in Sweetwater, Texas and was founded in 1962 by Don Ludlum (1932-2015) who had previously worked for Eberline, another manufacturer of radiation detectors. The company now employs approximately 475 people and has sales representatives in over 80 countries. The company is widely accepted as the world's best selling radiation detection brand.

References

External links
Official Website
Medline Laboratory Equipment
News article on Ludlum Measurements
US Chamber of Commerce feature on Ludlum Measurements

1962 establishments in Texas
Laboratory equipment manufacturers
Manufacturing companies established in 1962
Nolan County, Texas